Akçaören is a village in the District of Kazan, Ankara Province, Turkey. In 2000, it had a population of 100 people.

References

Villages in Kahramankazan District